The Bajaj Pulsar N250 is a sports bike made by Indian motorcycle manufacturer Bajaj Auto. It was launched on 28 October 2021 along with faired version of Bajaj Pulsar F250 to marked the 20 years anniversary of Bajaj Pulsar.

It was initially launched in three colors- Red, blue and techno grey and with single channel ABS. In June of 2022, a dual channel ABS variant was added exclusively with  Brooklyn Black shade.

See also
 Bajaj Pulsar

References

External links

Pulsar
Motorcycles introduced in the 2010s